The National Car Museum of Iran ( Muze Melli Xodrodu Irân) is a museum in Karaj, Iran, opened in . Displayed at the museum are classic cars owned by the last Shah of the Pahlavi Dynasty, Mohammad Reza Shah. In addition to the large museum which is open to the public, there is a restoration center at the back closed to the public.

Cars in the Museum
There are many vehicles in the museum, ranging from sports cars to limousines, carriages and bikes which carried the royal family. Some of the items include:
Rolls-Royce Silver Ghost (Black)
Rolls-Royce Phantom I (Black)
Rolls-Royce Phantom II (Black)
Rolls-Royce Phantom III (Black)
Rolls-Royce Silver Cloud III (Convertible, Maroon)
Rolls-Royce Phantom IV (Black)
Rolls-Royce Phantom V (Maroon)
Rolls-Royce Phantom VI (Maroon)
Rolls-Royce Corniche (Navy Blue)
Rolls-Royce Camargue (Caribbean Blue)
Jaguar Mark IX
Daimler DS420
Stutz Blackhawk
Lamborghini Miura (White)
Lamborghini Espada (Yellow)
Lamborghini Countach (Metallic red) Gift to Mohammad Reza Pahlavi from his aunt, after he passed driving test.
Ford Mustang 
Cadillac Eldorado (Silver) Queen Farah Diba's car
Chrysler 300 1956 Special K300 - a one-off example with a body designed by Ghia, said to have been a wedding present of the Shah to his second wife Soraya, equipped with fridge and record player
Mercedes-Benz 500K originally equipped with a 540K engine - one of six W29 "Autobahn-Kurier" ever built, one of three survivors. Currently a Cadillac in-line 8-cylinder engine of obscure provenience is installed in the car.
Mercedes-Benz 600 three LWB (2 Landaulets of 59 ever built) cars; one SWB car
Mercedes-Benz 190SL W121
Mercedes-Benz W111 280SE
Mercedes-Benz Type 300 Sc, W188I, Cabriolet A with Landau bars
Mercedes-Benz Type 300 S, W188II, 2+2 coupé  
Morris Oxford
Jensen Interceptor III 
Fiat 519
Ferrari 365 4+4 (Silver)
Ferrari 500 Superfast Superamerica
Maserati Ghibli Coupé
MPV Tehran Type (with the incredible story that it has been specially designed together by Mercedes-Benz, Porsche and Volkswagen for the last crown prince of Iran, Reza Pahlavi)
Panther Lazer One-Off
Bizzarrini 5300 GT Strada
Porsche 911 (black) Le Mans winner, 600 hp
Porsche 930 (light blue metallic) 
Porsche 928 29 km on the odometer
Ford Model A
BMW R 100 RS - the Shah's bike, with 692 km on the odometer
Honda Gold Wing GL1000 (1976) - Queen Farah Diba's bike
Harley-Davidson WL 750 (1944)

History
After the Iranian Revolution of 1979, the Mohammad Reza Shah and his family fled the country and leaving behind most of their possessions. Mohammad Reza Shah was famous for his love of sports cars, and he was known for taking one of his many cars late at night and racing on the highways around Tehran. After he fled the country in January 1979, the cars first stayed untouched. During the revolutionary chaos some were stolen from the palaces, others were put into hiding: either stored in garages, hidden underground, or even pushed into water. 
Two Rolls-Royces (the Silver Ghost and the Phantom IV) were in the UK for restoration when the Revolution broke out in Iran. The Pahlavi's claimed them to be their private property. But, after 11 years of legal dispute Iran finally succeeded in having them transferred to Iran. 
At one place in time reportedly more than 1000 cars were sold by authorities of the Islamic Republic in one deal to an Arab Prince for 2 billion Rials, roughly 5 million US$ at that time. Obviously these luxury items were regarded leavings of the "decadent monarchic times" and of no value to the now Islamic country.
Only by vigilance of other Iranian authorities the export of these items of unmeasurable value (some believe even exceeding the value of the crown jewels of the national treasury of Iran) was stopped literally at the banks of the Persian Gulf, in the harbour of Bandar Abbas, and returned to Tehran. 
Since then the late Shah's cars are regarded part of the national heritage. The Daimler company of Germany is said to have offered several million Euros to purchase the Mercedes 500 K Autobahn-Kurier for its Museum in Stuttgart (Mercedes-Benz Museum), to the Cultural Heritage Organization of Iran - but without success.
Prior to the inauguration of the museum in 2001, run mainly by private initiative of Iranian car enthusiasts, a small portion of the remaining 1200 cars were recovered, cleaned and put into the museum to display to the public. More than 1000 cars still reside in storage, garage or in Parks (e.g. in the park of Sa'dabad Palace) and wait to be made accessible to the public.

See also
Cultural Heritage Organization of Iran
Safir Office Machines Museum
List of museums in Iran

External links
 

National museums of Iran
Automotive museums
Mohammad Reza Pahlavi
Museums established in 2001
2001 establishments in Iran
Buildings and structures in Alborz Province
Tourist attractions in Alborz Province